Luborzyca  is a village in Kraków County, Lesser Poland Voivodeship, in southern Poland. It is the seat of the gmina (administrative district) called Gmina Kocmyrzów-Luborzyca.

The village has a population of 590.

References

Villages in Kraków County